A buccal mask is a mask covering the buccal area and mouth. Often the mask will also cover the nose, in which case it may also be referred to as a naso-buccal mask.

Buccal masks were a common feature in some ancient Mesoamerican cultures and are portrayed on Aztec, Zapotec, and Epi-Olmec culture artwork.

Functional masks